Gordon Hendrick (February 16, 1949) is a former Republican member of the Montana Legislature.  He was elected to House District 14 which represents the Superior area. Due to Montana's term limits, he was ineligible to run for re-election in 2012. He was succeeded by Republican candidate Nicholas Schwaderer for the 2013 legislature cycle.

References

Living people
1949 births
Republican Party members of the Montana House of Representatives
People from Mineral County, Montana